Rustai Emam Ali (also Romanized as Rūstāī Emām ʿAlī) is a village in Chahdegal Rural District, Negin Kavir District, Fahraj County, Kerman Province, Iran. At the 2006 census, its population was 112, in 24 families.

References 

Populated places in Fahraj County